"My Heart's in the Highlands" is a 1789 song and poem by Robert Burns, sung to the tune "Failte na Miosg".

1:
My heart's in the Highlands, my heart is not here,
My heart's in the Highlands, a-chasing the deer;
Chasing the wild-deer, and following the roe,
My heart's in the Highlands, wherever I go.

2:
Farewell to the Highlands, farewell to the North,
The birth-place of Valour, the country of Worth;
Wherever I wander, wherever I rove,
The hills of the Highlands forever I'll love.

(Chorus:)
My heart's in the Highlands, my heart is not here,
My heart's in the Highlands, a-chasing the deer;
Chasing the wild-deer, and following the roe,
My heart's in the Highlands, wherever I go.

3:
Farewell to the mountains, high-cover'd with snow,
Farewell to the straths and green valleys below;
Farewell to the forests and wild-hanging woods,
Farewell to the torrents and loud-pouring floods.

(Chorus:)
My heart's in the Highlands my heart is not here,
My heart's in the Highlands, a-chasing the deer;
Chasing the wild-deer, and following the roe,
My heart's in the Highlands, wherev'r I go
My heart's in the Highlands, farewell.

Compositions
"My Heart's in the Highlands" has been arranged for countertenor (alto) and organ by Arvo Pärt.

References

External links
  Lorna Anderson, soprano; Concerto Caledonia directed by David McGuinness

1789 songs
Songs with lyrics by Robert Burns
Poetry by Robert Burns